Red Cow is a restaurant in Seattle, in the U.S. state of Washington.

Description
The Ethan Stowell restaurant in Seattle's Madrona neighborhood has a French bistro menu focused on steak frites. Lonely Planet says, "The decor is typical Stowell – open kitchen, intimate interior and clean-lined minimalist design – while the menu star is steak (seven different cuts), frites and garlic aioli. On other plates, the food doesn't stray too far from France. Bank on lamb terrine, vol-au-vents and moules-frites (mussels and fries)."

History
The restaurant opened on February 10, 2014.

See also
 List of French restaurants
 List of restaurants in Seattle

References

External links
 Red Cow at Zomato

2014 establishments in Washington (state)
French restaurants in Seattle
Restaurants established in 2014